Baselios Paulose may refer to:

Baselios Paulose I (1836–1913), Catholicos of the East from 1912 to 1913
Baselios Paulose II (1914–1996), Catholicos of India of the Jacobite Syrian Christian Church from 1975 to 1996
Baselios Mar Thoma Paulose II (1946–2021), Catholicos of the East of the Malankara Orthodox Syrian Church from 2010